Poreče is a settlement in the upper Vipava Valley just north of Podnanos in the Municipality of Vipava in the Littoral region of Slovenia.

References

External links
Poreče at Geopedia

Populated places in the Municipality of Vipava